Wilborn Everett Bankston (1893–1970) was an American Major League Baseball outfielder. He played for the Philadelphia Athletics during the  season.

References

Major League Baseball outfielders
Philadelphia Athletics players
Baseball players from Georgia (U.S. state)
1893 births
1970 deaths
Cordele Ramblers players
Atlanta Crackers players
Charleston Sea Gulls players
Richmond Climbers players
Toledo Iron Men players
Richmond Virginians (minor league) players
Greenville Spinners players
Charlotte Hornets (baseball) players
Augusta Tygers players
Columbia Comers players
Richmond Colts players
Raleigh Capitals players
People from Barnesville, Georgia
People from Griffin, Georgia
Sportspeople from the Atlanta metropolitan area